Ingatestone railway station is on the Great Eastern Main Line in the East of England, serving the village of Ingatestone, Essex. Its three-letter station code is INT.

The station is currently managed by Greater Anglia, which also operates all trains serving it, as part of the East Anglia franchise.

History

The first station at Ingatestone was opened by the Eastern Counties Railway (ECR) in July 1843, sited just below Stock Lane, and operated for less than a month. The station consisted of wooden platforms on each side of the railway, connecting to the road carried above by wooden steps up the embankment.

However, the agreement for the construction of the railway across the Petre Estate, obtained in 1836, and section 7 of the enabling private Act of Parliament (An Act to amend and enlarge the powers and provisions of the Act relating to the Eastern Counties Railway) in 1838 both required that the Petre Estate consent to the construction of any station on the estate.

The railway obtained consent for the construction of a station adjacent to Old Hall Lane (now Station Lane), adjacent to the level crossing, subsequently the site of the existing station. Despite this, in August 1842 the railway requested permission to relocate the station to the cutting adjacent to the Stock Lane bridge, a change that Lord Petre refused to agree.

Following the legal case of Lord Petre v Eastern Counties Railway Company in August 1843, an injunction was issued by the High Court prohibiting use of the Stock Lane station. As a result, a permanent station on the present site was opened in 1844 and certainly given the present main station building, in Tudor style with diaper brickwork, in 1846. The up-side buildings (largely not in railway use for some years, but restored as a station café, with grant aid from the Railway Heritage Trust, in 2017) were provided by the Great Eastern Railway (GER) in 1885 to a domestic revival design by W. N. Ashbee.

Ingatestone station and the area around it form one of the first conservation areas to be designated in Essex. The railway station is a Grade II listed building.

Services

The services are operated by Greater Anglia.

References

External links

 

Grade II listed buildings in Essex
Railway stations in Essex
DfT Category D stations
Grade II listed railway stations
Former Great Eastern Railway stations
Greater Anglia franchise railway stations
Railway stations in Great Britain opened in 1843
William Neville Ashbee railway stations